Cychropsis brezinai is a species of ground beetle in the subfamily of Carabinae. It was described by Deuve in 1993.

References

brezinai
Beetles described in 1993